Kyriacos Z. Zygouriakis (born November 7, 1952) is a Greek-American chemical and biomedical engineer, currently the A. J. Hartsook Professor at Rice University and, as of 2012, a Fellow of the American Institute of Medical and Biological Engineers.

References

1952 births
Living people
Rice University faculty
Greek engineers
American biomedical engineers
American chemical engineers
Fellows of the American Institute for Medical and Biological Engineering